Nayon is the third month of the traditional Burmese calendar.

Festivals and observances
Tipitaka Festival -national Pariyatti Sasana examinations for Buddhist monks
Mahasamaya Day - full moon of Nayon

Nayon symbols
Flower: Jasmine

References

See also
Burmese calendar
Festivals of Burma

Burmese culture
Months of the Burmese calendar